Underneath the Same Moon is the second solo studio album recorded by John Rich. The album was recorded in 1999, after Rich departed from the country group Lonestar and before he joined Big Kenny in the duo Big & Rich. However, like Big Kenny's 1999 album Live a Little, this album was not released until 2006, after Big & Rich had released their first album.  Rich also self-released an album in 2001, Rescue Me, though it was recorded after Underneath the Same Moon.

"I Pray for You" was a chart single on the Hot Country Songs charts for Rich in 2000, peaking at number 53. Kenny also recorded the song on Live a Little, and as Big & Rich, they would record the song again for their 2005 album Comin' to Your City.

Critical reception
Stephen Thomas Erlewine of Allmusic gave the album two stars out of five, saying that it was "predictable, polished, and safe" in comparison to his works in Big & Rich, but said that "New Jerusalem" was "the most distinctive song" on the album.

Track listing

Personnel
Kenny Alphin - background vocals
Steve Brewster - drums, drum loops
Gary Burnette - electric guitar
Dennis Burnside - piano, synthesizer, Hammond B-3 organ
John Catchings - cello
Melodie Crittenden - background vocals
Eric Darken - percussion
Jay Dawson - bagpipes
Sara Evans - background vocals
The Fairfield Four - background vocals on "New Jerusalem"
Pat Flynn - acoustic guitar, mandolin
Shannon Forrest - drums
Wes Hightower - background vocals
Mike Johnson - pedal steel guitar
Liana Manis - background vocals
Delbert McClinton - background vocals
Michael Rhodes - bass guitar
Jim Rich - spoken word on "New Jerusalem"
John Rich - lead vocals, background vocals, acoustic guitar
Darrell Scott - acoustic guitar, classical guitar
Benmont Tench - piano, Hammond B-3 organ
Sharon Vaughn - background vocals
Kristin Wilkinson - viola, violin
John Willis - acoustic guitar, mandolin, classical guitar
Glenn Worf - bass guitar

Chart performance

Album

Singles

References

1999 debut albums
BNA Records albums
Legacy Recordings albums
John Rich albums
Albums produced by John Rich